Rasheed Olabiyi (born 8 August 1990 in Ibadan) is an association football midfielder.

Career

Youth
As a youth, Olabiyi spent time with the Pepsi Football Academy in Nigeria. During the 2006 and 2007 seasons, he was named the team's MVP while playing alongside players such as John Obi Mikel and Elderson Echiejile.

Professional
In 2007, Olabiyi joined Enyimba International F.C. of the Nigerian Premier League. Between 2007 and 2015, he helped the club win the Nigeria Premier League in 2010 as well as the Nigerian FA Cup in 2009, 2013, and 2014. Additionally, he helped the team win two Nigerian Super Cups: 2010 and 2013. In 2010, he went on trial with Superleague Greece club Asteras Tripoli. In 2011, he was part of the squad that also reached the semifinals of the 2011 CAF Champions League. Following the 2014 season, he was awarded the league's Wonder Goal Award for his strike in a 3–3 draw against Abia Warriors. Olabiyi donated ₦ 50,000 of his prize money to the Ngwa Road Motherless Babies Home. Olabiyi left Enyimba in March 2015 after a seven-year stint over financial disagreements. It was announced at that time that he was set to join Shooting Stars SC, also of the NPL, with interest in the player also coming from Kano Pillars and Warri Wolves. It was later revealed that the move to Shooting Stars was a loan. He finished out the season with his hometown club, which included a 1–0 defeat to his former club Enyimba in May 2015.

On 9 July 2015, it was announced that Olabiyi had signed for the Houston Dynamo of Major League Soccer. He made his debut for his club the following day, coming on as a 79th-minute substitute for Alexander López in the eventual 2–0 victory over the San Jose Earthquakes.

Olabiyi signed with United Soccer League side Harrisburg City Islanders on 21 March 2017.

International
Olabiyi has represented Nigeria at the U17, U20, and U23 levels.

Honours
As of 10 July 2015

Individual
Pepsi Football Academy MVP: 2006, 2007
Nigeria Premier League Best XI: 2014
NPL Wonder Goal Award: 2014

Club
Nigeria Premier League Champion: 2009–10
Nigeria Premier League Runner-Up: 2012/2013, 2013/2014
Nigerian FA Cup: 2009, 2013, 2014
Nigerian Super Cup: 2010, 2013
2011 CAF Champions League: Semifinalist

References

External links
 
 

Living people
1990 births
Nigerian footballers
Houston Dynamo FC players
Penn FC players
Major League Soccer players
USL Championship players
Enyimba F.C. players
Expatriate soccer players in the United States
Nigerian expatriate footballers
Nigerian expatriate sportspeople in the United States
Pepsi Football Academy players
Sportspeople from Ibadan
Association football midfielders